Ulysses S. Grant High School (commonly Grant High School) is a public high school in the Grant Park neighborhood of Portland, Oregon, United States.

History 
Ulysses S. Grant High School opened in September 1924, with 1,191 students. Many of the schools in the Portland Public School district that were built between 1908 and 1932 were designed by architects Floyd Naramore and George Jones. During the early 1920s, so many schools were being built simultaneously in Portland, the district had to hire another architectural firm to design Grant High School, which is in the Classical Revival style by architects Knighton and Howell.  In November 1923, the bricklayers working on Grant went on strike after the district tried to cut costs by using a maintenance worker to lay bricks.

After the Vanport flood in May 1948, Grant was home to the Vanport Extension Center (now Portland State University) through the summer of that year.
Three motion pictures have been filmed at Grant High School: The made-for-TV movie Reunion (1980), Mr. Holland's Opus (1995), and Nearing Grace (2005).

Funded by a $482 million bond measure approved in 2012, A two-year modernization and expansion project of Grant High School began in June 2017 and was completed in the summer of 2019. The interior of the building was gutted and has been completely rebuilt. The project includes a new two-story common area, a new gymnasium, seismic retrofitting, and additional classroom space.

Student profile

In the 2016–2017 school year, Grant's student population was 67.8% white, 8.2% African American, 6.8% Hispanic, 4.7% Asian, 0.6% Native American, 0.2% Pacific Islander, and 11.7% mixed race. About 25% of Grant's students live out of boundaries and transfer in.

In 2008, 92% of the school's seniors received a high school diploma. Of 443 students, 388 graduated, 39 dropped out, six received a modified diploma, and ten were still in high school in 2009. In 2009, 27% of the students were transfers into the school.

Curriculum

Special programs
Grant High School houses the last installment of the Japanese Immersion Program, a 13-year immersion program, begun at Richmond Elementary and continued at Mt. Tabor Middle School.

Extracurricular activities
Grant's Constitution Team has been the state champion twelve times (2002, 2004–2009, 2011, 2013, 2015, 2017, and 2018), and has won the national competition three times (2013, 2015, 2018).

In 2011, Grant's student newspaper, The Grantonian, was replaced by the 36-page full-color monthly Grant Magazine. In its first year, the magazine won Best In Show at the Oregon Fall Press day.  It has also won the Columbia University Scholastic Press Association's Gold Crown award three years in a row, from 2014 through 2016.

Athletics

GHS's mascot is the Grant General, in honor of its namesake General and 18th US President, Ulysses S. Grant.

State championships

 Men's football: 1943, 1945, 1946, 1949, 1950, 1963 (tie with North Salem)
 Men's gymnastics: 1982
 Men's baseball:  1958
 Men's basketball: 1969, 1986, 1988, 2008, 2018
 Men's soccer team: 2008
 Men's tennis: 2005
 Men's swimming: 2010
 Men's cross country: 1957, 1958, 1963, 1964 
 Women’s soccer: 2021
 Men's track and field: 1930, 1931, 1939, 1961, 1965, 1966, 1968, 1970, 1988
 Women's cross country: 1974, 2012

Notable alumni

 Kenneth Acker, pro football player
 Terrell Brandon, former NBA player
 Matt Braunger, comedian, MADtv, IKEA Heights
 Beverly Cleary, children's author, National Book Award and Newbery Medal recipient
 Charles Crookham, former Oregon Attorney General
 Ian Doescher, author of the William Shakespeare's Star Wars series.
 Linda Douglas, actress and model
 C. Gordon Fullerton, astronaut
 Tom Grant, musician
 Donald P. Hodel, former United States Secretary of the Interior and United States Secretary of Energy, former president of Focus on the Family
 Mike James, professional basketball player
 June Jones, NFL player, college and pro football head coach
 Thomas Lauderdale, pianist of band Pink Martini
 Lorry I. Lokey, founder of Business Wire, philanthropist
 Connie McCready, former mayor of Portland
 Jinkx Monsoon, actor and drag queen
 Mike Moser, basketball player
 Darryl Motley, MLB Kansas City Royals outfielder
 Janee Munroe, violist
 Bob Packwood, lawyer, former U.S. Senator
 Mark Radford, former NBA player 
 Harry Wayland Randall, former member of International Brigades that fought in Spanish Civil War
 George Shaw, NFL quarterback
 Al Siebert, author and educator
 Jefferson Smith, founder of Bus Project, former member of Oregon House of Representatives
 Sally Struthers, film and Emmy Award-winning actress of All in the Family
 Ndamukong Suh, NFL player, Miami Dolphins, Detroit Lions, Los Angeles Rams
 Robina Suwol, children's health advocate
 Vecepia Towery, winner of Survivor: Marquesas
 Caroline Walker, set world record in marathon while attending GHS
 Dominic Waters (born 1986), basketball player in the Israel Basketball Premier League
 Edward Curtis Wells, businessman
 Dan Wieden, CEO of Wieden+Kennedy

References

External links

 

1924 establishments in Oregon
Educational institutions established in 1924
Grant Park, Portland, Oregon
High schools in Portland, Oregon
Portland Public Schools (Oregon)
Public high schools in Oregon